HMS Lotus was a  that served in the Royal Navy.

She was built by Henry Robb Limited, of Leith, Scotland and launched on 16 January 1942. Originally named HMS Phlox, she was renamed in April 1942 after the previous  was transferred to the Free French Navy. She was commissioned in May 1942.

Service career
Lotus commissioned in May 1942, and was assigned to escort duty on the Arctic convoy route. In June she sailed with the ill-fated Convoy PQ 17. After the convoy scattered, Lotus accompanied Pozarica and several other ships to Novaya Zemlya, before setting out on her captain's initiative to search for survivors. Returning to Matochkin, Lotus and her companions escorted the eight ships there to Archangel, arriving on 11 July, although two were sunk by aircraft before reaching port. From Archangel, and with two other ships under the leadership of Comm. Dowling, Lotus helped to find and escort six more ships in the White Sea, and brought them to Archangel. She returned to Britain in September 1942 with Convoy QP 14.

These four corvettes served together for the remainder of the war at sea.

The following day Lotus and Poppy attacked an underwater contact off Algiers and were rewarded with the sounds of a U-boat breaking up,  which Lotuss captain, Lieutenant Commander HJ Hall, reported in an erudite signal to the Admiralty. Their lordships were so taken with the message that it was circulated throughout the fleet.

Lotus and her companions returned to the northern route in December 1942, serving with several Arctic convoys until the spring of 1943. In the summer of 1943, Lotus and her consorts were in the Mediterranean once more, on the Mediterranean leg of the KMS/MKS and GU/UG routes. That winter in 1943/4, Lotus and the corvettes were again in the Arctic, escorting JW/RA convoys, until the spring of 1944, when they transferred to the North Atlantic. They remained on this assignment, escorting HX, SC and ON convoys until the end of the war.

Postwar career
Lotus survived the Second World War, and served with the Royal Navy until 1947. That year she was put up for sale and bought by Christian Salvesen Ltd. She became the merchant vessel Southern Lotus. She was refitted as a buoy tender at Smith's Dock in 1948 and later used as a whaler until 1963. She was towed from Leith Harbour to Melsomvik in the Spring of 1963 and laid up. She was sold in December 1966 for breaking up in Belgium and towed, together with the Southern Briar (formerly ) by the tug Temi III. The towing wire broke on 18 December in stormy weather, causing both ships to ground and be wrecked off Jutland.

Notes

References
 
 Paul Kemp  : U-Boats Destroyed ( 1997) 
 Paul Kemp : Convoy! Drama in Arctic Waters (1993) 
 Stephen Roskill : The War at Sea 1939-1945   Vol II (1956). ISBN (none)
 Bernard Schofield : (1964) The Russian Convoys BT Batsford. ISBN (none)
 HMS Lotus at Uboat.net
 Convoy web
 HMS Lotus on the Arnold Hague database at convoyweb.org.uk. Look for entries labelled Lotus and HMS Lotus

 

Flower-class corvettes of the Royal Navy
1942 ships